Williamson High School can refer to:
Williamson High School (Alabama)
Williamson High School (Pennsylvania)
Williamson High School (West Virginia)